Raúl Párraga (born 16 setiembre 1947) is a Peruvian footballer. He played in four matches for the Peru national football team in 1975. He was also part of Peru's squad for the 1975 Copa América tournament.

References

External links
 

1944 births
Living people
Peruvian footballers
Peru international footballers
Place of birth missing (living people)
Association football midfielders
Club Universitario de Deportes footballers
Colegio Nacional Iquitos footballers